An Election to the Edinburgh Corporation was held on 2 May 1972, alongside municipal elections across Scotland. Of the councils 69 seats, 23 were up for election.

Following the election, with two by-elections pending, Edinburgh Corporation was composed of 33 Labour councillors, 21 Progressives, 9 Conservatives, and 5 Liberals. Labour did particularly well in the 1972 municipal elections across Scotland, and this was also the case in Edinburgh, where the party came close to gaining control of the council for the first time, controlling 33 of the councils 68 seats. The Liberals, with 5 seats, held the balance of power in the new council. Following the election Edinburgh corporation would elect its first Labour Lord Provost; Jack Kane.

The election also witnessed the continuation of the decline of the Progressives, who lost 5 seats.

Turnout was 42.1%.

Aggregate results

Ward Results

References

1972
Edinburgh Corporation
Corporation election, 1972